Nitish Kumar (born 1 March 1951) is an Indian politician, who is serving as Chief Minister of Bihar since 22 February 2015, having previous held the office from 2005 to 2014 and for a short period in 2000. The leader of the Janata Dal (United), previously he has also served as a Union Minister as the Samata Party member.

Kumar first entered politics as a member of the Janata Dal, becoming an MLA in 1985. A socialist, Kumar founded the Samata Party in 1994 along with George Fernandes. In 1996 he was elected to the Lok Sabha, and served as a Union Minister in the government of Atal Bihari Vajpayee, with his party joining the National Democratic Alliance. In 2003 his party merged into the Janata Dal (United), and Kumar became its leader.

In 2005, the NDA won a majority in the Bihar Legislative Assembly, and Kumar became chief minister heading a coalition with the Bharatiya Janata Party. In the 2010 state elections, the governing coalition won re-election in a landslide. In June 2013, Kumar broke with the BJP after Narendra Modi was named as their candidate for prime minister, and formed the Mahagathbandhan, a coalition with the Rashtriya Janata Dal and Indian National Congress.

On 17 May 2014, Kumar resigned as chief minister after the party suffered severe losses in the 2014 Indian general election, and was replaced by Jitan Ram Manjhi. However, he attempted to return as chief minister in February 2015, sparking a political crisis that eventually saw Manjhi resign and Kumar become chief minister again. Later that year, the Mahagathbandhan won a large majority in the state elections. In 2017, Kumar broke with the RJD over corruption allegations and returned to the NDA, leading another coalition with the BJP; at the 2020 state elections his government was narrowly reelected. In August 2022 Kumar left the NDA, rejoining the Mahagathbandhan (Grand Alliance) and UPA.

Early life
Kumar was born on 1 March 1951 in Bakhtiarpur, Bihar. His father, Kaviraj Ram Lakhan Singh, was an ayurvedic practitioner; his mother was Parmeshwari Devi from Nepal.  Nitish belongs to Kurmi agricultural caste. Nitish Kumar's Nickname Is 'Munna'.

He has earned a degree in Electrical Engineering  from Bihar College of Engineering (now NIT Patna) in 1972. He joined the Bihar State Electricity Board, half-heartedly, and later moved into politics. He married Manju Kumari Sinha (1955-2007) on 22 February 1973 and the couple has one son. Manju Sinha died in New Delhi on 14 May 2007 due to pneumonia.

Political career
Kumar belongs to a socialist class of politicians. During his early years as a politician he was associated with Ram Manohar Lohia, S. N. Sinha, Karpuri Thakur, and V. P. Singh. Kumar participated in Jayaprakash Narayan's movement between 1974 and 1977 and joined the Janata party headed by Satyendra Narain Sinha.

Kumar fought and first time won his election to the state assembly from Harnaut in 1985. In the initial years, Lalu Prasad Yadav was backed by Kumar as leader of the opposition in Bihar Assembly in the year 1989 but Kumar later switched his loyalty to BJP in 1996, after winning his first Lok Sabha seat from Barh.

The Janata Dal had survived the splits in past when leaders like Kumar and George Fernandes defected to form the Samata Party in 1994, but it remained a baseless party after the decision of Yadav to form Rashtriya Janata Dal in 1997. The second split took place prior to Rabri Devi assuming power which resulted in Janata Dal having only two leaders of any consequence in it, namely Sharad Yadav and Ram Vilas Paswan. Paswan was regarded as the rising leader of Dalits and had the credit of winning his elections with unprecedented margins. His popularity reached to the national level when he was awarded the post of Minister of Railways in the United Front government in 1996 and was subsequently made the leader of Lok Sabha. His outreach was witnessed in the western Uttar Pradesh too, when his followers organised an impressive rally at the behest of a newly floated organisation called Dalit Panthers.

Sharad Yadav was also a veteran socialist leader but without any massive support base. In the 1998 Parliamentary elections, the Samata Party and Janata Dal, which was in a much weaker position after the formation of RJD ended up eating each other's vote base. This made Kumar merge both the parties to form Janata Dal (United).

In 1999 Lok Sabha elections Rashtriya Janata Dal received a setback at the hand of BJP+JD(U) combine. The new coalition emerged leading in 199 out of 324 assembly constituencies and it was widely believed that in the forthcoming election to Bihar state assembly, the Lalu-Rabri rule will come to an end. The RJD had fought the election in an alliance with the Congress but the coalition didn't work making state leadership of Congress believe that the maligned image of Lalu Prasad after his name was drawn in the Fodder Scam had eroded his support base. Consequently, Congress decided to fight the 2000 assembly elections alone.

The RJD had to be satisfied with the communist parties as coalition partners but the seat-sharing conundrum in the camp of National Democratic Alliance made Kumar pull his Samta Party out of the Sharad Yadav and Ram Vilas Paswan faction of the Janata Dal.
Differences also arose between the BJP and Kumar as the latter wanted to be projected as the Chief Minister of Bihar but the former was not in favour. Even Paswan also wanted to be a CM face. The Muslims and OBCs were too divided in their opinion. A section of Muslims, which included the poor communities like Pasmanda were of the view that Yadav only strengthened upper Muslims like Shaikh, Sayyid and Pathans and they were in search of new options.

Yadav also alienated other dominant backward castes like Koeri and Kurmi since his projection as the saviour of Muslims. It is argued by Sanjay Kumar that the belief that, "the dominant OBCs like the twin caste of Koeri-Kurmi will ask for share in power if he seeks their support while the Muslims will remain satisfied with the protection during communal riots only" made Yadav neglect them. Moreover, the divisions in both the camps made the political atmosphere in the state a charged one in which many parties were fighting against each other with no visible frontiers. JD(U) and BJP were fighting against each other on some of the seats and so was the Samta Party. The result was a setback for the BJP, which in media campaigns was emerging with a massive victory. RJD emerged as the single largest party and with the political manoeuvring of Lalu Yadav, Rabri Devi was sworn in as the Chief Minister again. The media largely failed to gauge the ground level polarisation in Bihar. According to Sanjay Kumar:
 Even after serving imprisonment in connection with the 1997 scam, Lalu seemed to relish his role as the lower-caste jester. He argued that corruption charges against him and his family were the conspiracy of the upper-caste bureaucracy and media elites threatened by the rise of peasant cultivator castes.

In 2004 General elections, Lalu's RJD had outperformed other state-based parties by winning 26 Lok Sabha seats in Bihar. He was awarded the post of Union Railway minister but the rising aspirations of the extremely backward castes unleashed by him resulted in JD(U) and BJP led coalition to defeat his party in 2005 Bihar Assembly elections.

Kumar as Union Minister

Nitish was briefly, the Union Minister for Railways and Minister for Surface Transport and later, the Minister for Agriculture in 1998–99, in the NDA government of Atal Bihari Vajpayee. In August 1999, he resigned following the Gaisal train disaster, for which he took responsibility as a minister.  However, in his short stint as Railway Minister, he brought in widespread reforms, such as internet ticket booking facility in 2002, opening a record number of railway ticket booking counters and introducing the tatkal scheme for instant booking.

Later that year, he rejoined the Union Cabinet as Minister for Agriculture. From 2001 to May 2004, he was – again – the Union Minister for Railways.   In the 2004 Lok Sabha elections, he contested elections from two places, when he was elected from Nalanda but lost from his traditional constituency, Barh.

Administration

Law and order reform
One of the biggest challenge before Kumar after becoming Chief Minister, during his first term, was deteriorated law and order situation of the state. There were many organised criminal gangs active in the state and kidnapping was considered as the biggest criminal activity. Besides, challenge of left wing extremism in some of the backward areas of the state was also persisting for a long time. Kumar brought the Arms Act, and special courts were set up to expedite the process of conviction of those held under this act. Bringing of the Arms Act and stringent implementation brought two way benefits for the Government; first, it became easy for the police to arrest a criminal and second, the use of lethal weapons became prohibited.

Kumar also recruited the retired army officials and soldiers to create a special wing of Police called Special Auxiliary Police (SAP),  in order to deal with the Maoist challenge in the state. It brought some kind of economic engagement for the retired military personnels, and at the same time, made available professionally trained commandos for the Bihar Police at low budgetry expense. These commandos were better than the police constables recruited by the state, in order to deal with the extremists. They just needed special category of weapons, which was provided by the state under Kumar. The retired intelligence officers were also recruited to form a investigation department, called "Special Vigilance Unit" (SVU). This body dealt with the offences at the level of high level government officials. For acquisition of property of the accused during trial, Bihar Special Court Act 2009 was brought, which became effective since 2010. The SVU remained a successful idea in dealing with corruption at the higher level of bureaucracy. One of the first case before it was the trial of former Director General of Police, Narayan Mishra, who was held for several corruption charges against him. 

In order to recruit only the qualified candidates in the state Police, the reform in recruitment examination was also brought. Kumar introduced the "Carbon Copy system" in the written examination, which was to be held to recruit the new entrants. In order to prevent tampering of the examination copy, the original copy marked by the candidate was sent directly to the strong room after the examination. The evaluators used to get only the Carbon Copy, and in case of any discrepancy, the original copy was matched with the Carbon Copy evaluated by the evaluators. Further, a permanent recruitment examination was also made compulsory and the physical examination was made qualifying in determining merit, for selection to constabulary. In the tenure of Chief Ministers prior to Kumar, only physical examination was deciding factor in selecting the constables. This system was prone to corruption and favoritism.

The push to the speedy trial under Kumar's government brought results within a short period of time, and in 2006 itself, a total of 6,839 offenders were convicted. There witnessed a massive drop in cases registered under the Arms act in the forthcoming terms of Kumar as the Chief Minister. It declined to just 495 by the end of 2010 from 1609 in 2006. According to one opinion, the massive decline was a result of fleeing of many criminals from the state, in order to seek refuse in the terai region of Nepal as well as eschewing of crime by others to become good samaritans.

Kumar's government also took step to empower the District Magistrate to apprehend the officials taking bribe in order to reduce corruption. One of the major problem of the prison system of Bihar was laxity available to criminals to operate cell phones from the jail. Many a times, organised crime were planned from within the premise of Bihar's prison. The government took step to fix Mobile phone jammers in jails, to prohibit the gangsters from operating cell phones. Bihar also actively enforced the All India Prison reforms program, outlined by Supreme Court of India in a judgement, in order to reform the entire operating system of jails. It included reducing the number of inmates to be included in a particular prison, a step, which was necessary to prevent the overcrowding.

In order to break the link of the prisoners with the jail authorities, Kumar's government took step like periodically transferring the dreaded criminals, who were convicted in large number of criminal cases from one prison to more secure cells located in Bhagalpur and Beur. One of the significant example of this include, the transfer of Ajay Kanu, a naxalite, who was prime accused in "2005 Jahanabad Jail Break case", to Beur Jail. In 2022, gangsters like Rakesh Mahto, who was leader of crime syndicate being organised from Muzaffarpur, was also transferred from Muzaffarpur to Bhagalpur Jail, in a high security Prison cell. Other example, which is part of this routine procedure is of Rashtriya Janata Dal Member of Bihar Legislative Council, Ritlal Yadav, who had numerous cases of extortion and murder against him.

Tenure as Chief Minister of Bihar
Kumar is a member of the Janata Dal (United) political party. As the chief minister, he appointed more than 100,000 school teachers, ensured that doctors worked in primary health centres, electrified many villages, paved roads, cut female illiteracy by half, turned around a lawless state by cracking down on criminals and doubled the income of the average Bihari.

First term (2000–2000) 
In March 2000, Nitish was elected Chief Minister of Bihar for the first time at the behest of the Vajpayee Government in the centre. NDA and allies had 151 MLAs whereas Lalu Prasad Yadav had 159 MLAs in the 324 member house. Both alliances were less than the majority mark that is 163. Nitish resigned before he could prove his numbers in the house. He lasted 7 days in the post.

Second term (2005–2010) 

After victory in 2005 Bihar Assembly elections, Kumar a leader of OBC Kurmi caste was sworn in as the chief minister. During Lalu's time, backward caste candidates came to dominate the Bihar assembly claiming half of the seats in it and it was the aspiration of this powerful social community that led to friction among the united backwards, leading to the rise of Kumar who made both social justice and development as his political theme.

Third term (2010–2014) 
Kumar's government also initiated bicycle and meal programs. Giving bicycles to girls who stayed in school resulted in the state getting a huge number of girls into schools and a reduction in school dropout rates.

In 2010, Kumar's party swept back to power along with its then allies, the Bharatiya Janata Party, and he again became Chief Minister.  The alliance won 206 seats, while the RJD won 22. For the first time, electorates witnessed high turnout of women and young voters, while this was declared as the fairest election in Bihar, with no bloodshed or poll violence.

Resignation
On 17 May 2014, Kumar submitted his resignation to the Governor of Bihar, a day after his party fared poorly in the 2014 Lok Sabha elections, winning just 2 seats against 20 seats in the previous election. Kumar resigned, taking the moral responsibility of his party's poor performance in the election, and Jitan Ram Manjhi took over.

Fourth term (2015 - 2020) 

Kumar again became Chief Minister on 22 February 2015, on the backdrop of upcoming 2015 Bihar Legislative Assembly election, considered to be his toughest election to date. His JD(U), along with RJD and Congress, formed the Mahagathbandhan (Grand Alliance) to counter the BJP in Bihar.

Kumar campaigned aggressively during the elections for the Grand Alliance, countering the allegations raised by Narendra Modi and the BJP. The Grand Alliance won the Assembly election by a margin of 178 over the BJP and its allies, with RJD emerging as the largest party with 80 seats and JD(U) placed second with 71. Kumar was sworn in as Chief Minister on 20 November 2015 for a record fifth time and Tejashwi Yadav became Deputy Chief Minister of Bihar.

Kumar's campaign was managed by the Indian Political Action Committee (I-PAC) who were hired to managed the campaign for JD(U). I-PAC designed the campaign strategy which included reaching out to a larger set of voters through innovative campaigns, including sending hundreds of branded cycles for outreach, Har Ghar Dastak (door-to-door outreach) and the DNA campaign.

Mahagathbandhan breakup

When corruption charges were levelled against Tejashwi Yadav, the Deputy Chief Minister, Kumar asked for him to resign from the cabinet. The Rashtriya Janata Dal refused to do so, and therefore Kumar resigned on 26 July 2017, thus ending the Grand Alliance. He joined the principal opposition, the NDA, and came back to power within a few hours.

Fifth term (2020–2022) 

Capitalising on his 15 years consecutive terms as Chief Minister, Kumar highlighted various achievements and developments and listed various schemes carried out by his government and finally managed to get over a tightly contested election. NDA managed to get majority in Legislature Assembly by winning 125 seats as compared to Mahagathbandhan's 110 seats. He was sworn in as Bihar Chief Minister for seventh time in 20 years in the presence of top leaders of NDA.

On 9 August 2022, Kumar resigned as chief minister and removed his party from the NDA, announcing that his party had rejoined the Mahagathbandhan, and would form a governing coalition with the RJD and INC.

Sixth Term (2022 - present) 
On 9 August 2022, Kumar broke the alliance with the BJP and resigned as chief minister and revoked his party from the NDA, announcing that his party had rejoined the Mahagathbandhan, comprising RJD, INC, CPI and other independents, and would form a governing coalition. On 10 August he sworn in as the chief minister of the state for the eighth time in 22 years.  Bihar caste-based survey 2023 ‎started in his sixth term.

Biographies

Sankarshan Thakur authored Single Man: The Life and Times of Nitish Kumar of Bihar.
Arun Sinha has authored a book titled Nitish Kumar and The Rise of Bihar.

Awards and recognition

 Anuvrat Puraskar, by Shwetambar Terapanthi Mahasabha (Jain organisation), for enforcing total prohibition on liquor in Bihar, 2017
 JP Memorial Award, Nagpur's Manav Mandir, 2013
 Ranked 77th in Foreign Policy Magazine top 100 global thinkers 2012
 XLRI, Jamshedpur Sir Jehangir Ghandy Medal for Industrial & Social Peace 2011
 "MSN Indian of the Year 2010"
 NDTV Indian of the Year – Politics, 2010
 Forbes "India's Person of the Year", 2010
 CNN-IBN "Indian of the Year Award" – Politics, 2010
 NDTV Indian of the Year – Politics, 2009
 Economics Times "Business Reformer of the Year 2009"
 Polio Eradication Championship Award 2009, by Rotary International
 CNN-IBN Great Indian of the Year – Politics, 2008
 The Best Chief Minister, according to the CNN-IBN and Hindustan Times State of the Nation Poll 2007

Positions held

See also
List of politicians from Bihar
Ganga Water Lift Project

References

External links

 
 
 

|-

|-

Nitish Kumar
1951 births
Living people
People from Nalanda
India MPs 2004–2009
Chief Ministers of Bihar
Janata Dal politicians
Janata Dal (United) politicians
Lok Sabha members from Bihar
Railway Ministers of India
Agriculture Ministers of India
V. P. Singh administration
India MPs 1989–1991
India MPs 1991–1996
India MPs 1996–1997
India MPs 1998–1999
India MPs 1999–2004
Members of the Bihar Legislative Council
Bihari politicians
Lok Dal politicians